Tim Schuele (born November 9, 1990) is a German professional ice hockey defenceman currently playing for Bietigheim Steelers in the Deutsche Eishockey Liga (DEL). 

Schuele returned to Düsseldorf after he previously played five seasons with the Thomas Sabo Ice Tigers. He joined the Löwen Frankfurt in 2017

References

External links

1990 births
Living people
SC Bietigheim-Bissingen players
DEG Metro Stars players
Düsseldorfer EG players
German ice hockey defencemen
Löwen Frankfurt players
Thomas Sabo Ice Tigers players
People from Bietigheim-Bissingen
Sportspeople from Stuttgart (region)